Kasper Roug (born 6 June 1979 in Nakskov) is a Danish politician, who is a member of the Folketing for the Social Democrats political party. He was elected into parliament at the 2019 Danish general election.

Political career
Roug has been a member of the municipal council of Lolland Municipality since 2018. Roug has been a substitute member of the Folketing on two occasions: from 3 November 2015 to 3 June 2016 substituting for Astrid Krag, and from 12 March 2018 to 31 May 2018 substituting for Rasmus Horn Langhoff. In 2019 he was elected into parliament, receiving 5,249 personal votes in the election.

References

External links
 Biography on the website of the Danish Parliament (Folketinget)

Living people
1979 births
People from Lolland Municipality
Social Democrats (Denmark) politicians
Danish municipal councillors
Members of the Folketing 2019–2022
Members of the Folketing 2022–2026